Roy Daryl Adams is an American politician and businessman serving as a member of the Louisiana House of Representatives from the 62nd district. He was elected in a special election on March 30, 2019, and assumed office soon after.

Education 
Adams attended Southwest Mississippi Junior College and the University of Louisiana at Monroe.

Career 
He is the founder and owner of Adams Enterprises, a grocery store. He has also worked as an independent contractor for Capital City Press, a commercial printing organization based in Baton Rouge, Louisiana. He was elected to the Louisiana House of Representatives in a March 30, 2019 special election, succeeding Kenny Havard.

References 

Living people
Louisiana Independents
Members of the Louisiana House of Representatives
21st-century American politicians
University of Louisiana at Monroe alumni
Year of birth missing (living people)